Hall Green School is a mixed secondary school located in the Hall Green area of Birmingham, in the West Midlands of England.

The school was established on its current site in 1964, after moving from the site of Sparkhill Commercial College. Previously a foundation school administered by Birmingham City Council, Hall Green School converted to academy status in February 2012. However the school continues to coordinate with Birmingham City Council for admissions. Hall Green School offers GCSEs and BTECs as programmes of study for pupils.

References

External links
 

Secondary schools in Birmingham, West Midlands
Educational institutions established in 1964
1964 establishments in England
Academies in Birmingham, West Midlands